This is the list of the number-one albums of the Specialist Classical Albums Chart during the 2000s.

Number ones

See also

List of UK Albums Chart number ones of the 2000s

Notes

References

External links
Specialist Classical Albums Top 20 at the Official Charts Company

2000s in British music
United Kingdom Specialist Classical Albums
Specialist Classical